Bozhou South railway station is a railway station on the Shangqiu–Hangzhou high-speed railway in Qiaocheng District, Bozhou, Anhui, China. Opened on 1 December 2019, this is the second railway station in the built-up area of Qiaocheng District. Bozhou railway station offers conventional rail service.

References

Railway stations in Anhui
Railway stations in China opened in 2019